Mill Grove is a historic house and estate on Pawlings Road in Audubon, Pennsylvania.  Built in the 1760s, it is notable as the first home in America of painter and naturalist John James Audubon (1785-1851), for whom the community is named. The  estate is now maintained as a museum and wildlife sanctuary by Montgomery County, and was designated a National Historic Landmark in 1989.  The house serves as the educational center of the Pennsylvania chapter of the National Audubon Society, and is known as John James Audubon Center at Mill Grove.

Description and history
Mill Grove is located on the west side of the village of Audubon, just north of Valley Forge National Historical Park. The main house is a -story stone structure, oriented to overlook the creek. Its roof faces are each pierced by three wood-frame gabled dormers, and there are stone chimneys at the interior of each end. A single-story ell extends the building to one side, and a gabled porch shelters the main entrance.

The house was built about 1762 by James Morgan, who also operated a mill and  lead mine on the property.  He built the addition in 1765 to serve as a tavern for passing travelers.  Due to its proximity to Valley Forge, it was looted during the American Revolutionary War, although the house was spared from significant damage.  The property was purchased in 1789 by Jean Audubon, a French sea captain.  In 1803 he sent his seventeen-year-old son Jean (who soon anglicized his name John James Audubon) to Mill Grove to oversee further development of the mine.  Instead of doing so, the young Audubon became enamored with the natural beauty of the area.  In the two years he spent here, he taught himself methods of tracking birds by banding, and how to set specimens for drawings.  He also became engaged to Lucy Bakewell, returning here in 1808 for the wedding.  During Audubon's absence between 1805 and 1808, the property was overseen by another Frenchman, to whom Audubon sold the property following his wedding. In 1813 it was bought by Samuel Wetherill, in whose family it remained until 1951.  His heirs turned the property over to the county, which has managed it since as a wildlife preserve and nature center.

The estate now comprises  with more than five miles (8 km) of trails.  The house features a museum displaying original Audubon prints, all of his major oil paintings and memorabilia.

See also

List of National Historic Landmarks in Pennsylvania
National Register of Historic Places listings in Montgomery County, Pennsylvania

References

External links
John James Audubon Center at Mill Grove
Montgomery County Historic Sites: Mill Grove

National Historic Landmarks in Pennsylvania
Museums in Montgomery County, Pennsylvania
Houses on the National Register of Historic Places in Pennsylvania
Houses completed in 1804
Art museums and galleries in Pennsylvania
Historic house museums in Pennsylvania
Audubon, John James
Houses in Montgomery County, Pennsylvania
National Audubon Society
Nature centers in Pennsylvania
National Register of Historic Places in Montgomery County, Pennsylvania